The Pythonidae, commonly known as pythons, are a family of nonvenomous  snakes found in Africa, Asia, and Australia. Among its members are some of the largest snakes in the world. Ten genera and 39 species are currently recognized. Being naturally non-venomous, pythons must constrict their prey to suffocate it prior to consumption. Pythons will typically strike at and bite their prey of choice to gain hold of it; they then must use physical strength to constrict their prey, by coiling their muscular bodies around the animal, effectively suffocating it before swallowing whole. This is in stark contrast to venomous snakes such as the rattlesnake, for example, which delivers a swift, venomous bite but releases, waiting as the prey succumbs to envenomation before being consumed.  Collectively, the pythons are well-documented and -studied as constrictors, much like other non-venomous snakes, including the boas and even kingsnakes of the New World.

Distribution and habitat
Pythons are found in sub-Saharan Africa, Nepal, India, Sri Lanka, Bangladesh, Southeast Asia, southeastern Pakistan, southern China, the Philippines and Australia.

In the United States, an introduced population of Burmese pythons (Python bivittatus) has existed as an invasive species in Everglades National Park since the late 1990s. As of January 2023, estimates place the Floridian Burmese python population at around half a million. Local bounties are awarded and scientists study dead Burmese pythons to better understand breeding cycles and trends associated with rapid population explosion. The pythons readily prey on native North American fauna in Florida, including (but not limited to) American alligators, birds, bobcats, American bullfrogs, opossums, raccoons, river otters, white-tailed deer, and occasionally domestic pets and livestock. They are also known to prey on other invasive and introduced animals to Florida, such as the green iguana and nutria (coypu), though not at a rate as to lower their numbers rapidly or effectively.

Common names
 Sinhala - පිඹුරා (Pimbura)
Telugu - కొండచిలువ (Kondachiluva)
Odia - ଅଜଗର (Ajagara)
Malayalam - പെരുമ്പാമ്പ് (perumpāmp)
Hindi - अजगर ('Ajgar')
Filipino - Sawa
Indonesian - Sanca

Conservation

Many species have been hunted aggressively, which has greatly reduced the population of some, such as the Indian python (Python molurus).

Behavior

Most members of this family are ambush predators, in that they typically remain motionless in a camouflaged position, and then strike suddenly at passing prey. Attacks on humans, although known to occur, are extremely rare.

Feeding
Pythons use their sharp, backward-curving teeth, four rows in the upper jaw, two in the lower, to grasp prey which is then killed by constriction; after an animal has been grasped to restrain it, the python quickly wraps a number of coils around it. Death occurs primarily by cardiac arrest.

Larger specimens usually eat animals about the size of a domestic cat, but larger food items are known; some large Asian species have been known to take down adult deer, and the Central African rock python, Python sebae, has been known to eat antelope. In 2017, there was a recorded case of a human devoured by a python in Sulawesi, Indonesia. All prey is swallowed whole, and may take several days or even weeks to fully digest.

Even the larger species, such as the reticulated python, Malayopython reticulatus, do not crush their prey to death; in fact, prey is not even noticeably deformed before it is swallowed. The speed with which the coils are applied is impressive and the force they exert may be significant, but death is caused by cardiac arrest.

Reproduction
Pythons are oviparous. This sets them apart from the family Boidae (boas), most of which bear live young (ovoviviparous). After they lay their eggs, females typically incubate them until they hatch. This is achieved by causing the muscles to "shiver", which raises the temperature of the body to a certain degree, and thus that of the eggs. Keeping the eggs at a constant temperature is essential for healthy embryo development. During the incubation period, females do not eat and leave only to bask to raise their body temperature.

Captivity
Most species in this family are available in the exotic pet trade. However, caution must be exercised with the larger species, as they can be dangerous; rare cases of large specimens killing their owners have been documented.

Taxonomy
Obsolete classification schemes—such as that of Boulenger (1890)—place pythons in Pythoninae, a subfamily of the boa family, Boidae. However, despite a superficial resemblance to boas, pythons are more closely related to sunbeam snakes (Xenopeltis) and the Mexican burrowing python (Loxocemus).

Genera

Relationship with humans

Poaching pythons 
Poaching of pythons is a lucrative business with the global python skin trade being an estimated US$1 billion as of 2012. Pythons are poached for their meat, mostly consumed locally as bushmeat and their skin, which is sent to Europe and North America for manufacture of accessories like bags, belts and shoes. The demand for poaching is increased because python farming is very expensive.

In Cameroon bushmeat markets, the Central African rock python is commonly sold for meat and is very expensive at US$175. The poaching of the pythons is illegal in Cameroon under their wildlife law, but there is little to no enforcement. In Kenya, there has been an increase in snake farms to address the demand for snakeskin internationally, but there are health concerns for the workers, and danger due to poachers coming to the farms to hunt the snakes.

Pythons and human health 
While pythons are not venomous, they do carry a host of potential health issues for humans. Pythons are disease vectors for multiple illnesses, including Salmonella, Chlamydia, Leptospirosis, Aeromoniasis, Campylobacteriosis, and Zygomycosis. These diseases may be transmitted to humans through excreted waste, open wounds, and contaminated water. A 2013 study found that Reptile-Associated Salmonella (RAS) is most common in young children who had been in contact with invasive pythons, with symptoms including "sepsis, meningitis, and bone and joint infection".

Pythons are also integrated into some aspects of African health and belief use, often with the added risk of contacting zoonotic diseases. Python bodies and blood are used for African traditional medicines and other belief uses as well, one in-depth study of all animals used by the Yorubas of Nigeria for traditional medicine found that the African Python is used to cure rheumatism, snake poison, appeasing witches, and accident prevention.

Python habitats, diets, and invasion into new areas also impact human health and prosperity. A University of Florida Institute of Food and Agriculture Sciences study found that the Burmese python, as an invasive species, enters new habitats and eats an increasing number of mammals, leaving limited species for mosquitoes to bite, forcing them to bite disease-carrying hispid cotton rats and then infect humans with the Everglades virus, a dangerous infection that is carried by very few animals. While direct human-python interactions can be potentially dangerous, the risk of zoonotic diseases is always a concern, whether considering medical and belief use in Nigeria or when addressing invasive species impacts in Florida.

Traditional use

Skin 
Python skin has traditionally been used as the attire of choice for medicine men and healers. Typically, South African Zulu traditional healers will use python skin in ceremonial regalia. Pythons are viewed by the Zulu tradition to be a sign of power. This is likely why the skin is worn by traditional healers. Healers are seen as all-powerful since they have a wealth of knowledge, as well as accessibility to the ancestors.

Fat 
Typically, species are attributed to healing various ailments based on their likeliness to a specific bodily attribute. For example, in many cultures, the python is seen as a strong and powerful creature. As a result, pythons are often prescribed as a method of increasing strength. It is very common for the body fat of pythons to be used to treat a large variation of issues such as joint pain, rheumatic pain, toothache and eye sight. Additionally, python fat has been used to treat those suffering from mental illnesses like psychosis. Their calm nature is thought to be of use to treat combative patients. The fat of the python is rubbed onto the body part that is in pain. To improve mental illnesses, it is often rubbed on the temple. The existence of evidence for genuine anti inflammatory and anti-microbial properties of the refined 'snake oil' ironic with respect to the expression "snake oil salesman".

Blood 
Python blood plays another important role in traditional medicine. Many believe that python blood prevents the accumulation of fatty acids, triglycerides and lipids from reaching critically high levels. Additionally, their blood has been used as a source of iron for people who are anemic, which helps reduce fatigue.[The sources were not specific on the way this blood is administered; however, due to the use of snake blood in traditional treatments in other parts of the world for similar causes, it is likely that the patient drinks the blood in order to feel the effects.

Feces 
The Sukuma tribe of Tanzania have been known to use python feces in order to treat back pain. The feces are frequently mixed with a little water, placed on the back, and left for two to three days.

Organs 
In Nigeria, the gallbladder and liver of a python are used to treat poison or bites from other snakes. The python head has been used to "appease witches". Many traditional African cultures believe that they can be cursed by witches. In order to reverse spells and bad luck, traditional doctors will prescribe python heads.

Folklore 
In northwestern Ghana, people see pythons as a savior and have taboos to prevent the snake from being harmed or eaten. Their folklore states that this is because a python once helped them flee from their enemies by transforming into a log to allow them to cross a river.

In Botswana, San ritual practices surrounding pythons date back 70,000 years. In San mythology the python is a sacred creature that is highly respected. They believe that mankind was made by a python that moved in between hills to create stream beds.

In Benin, Vodun practitioners believe that pythons symbolize strength and the spirit of Dagbe ["to do good" in Yoruba]. Annually, people sacrifice animals and proclaim their sins to pythons that are kept inside temples.

See also 
List of pythonid species and subspecies

References

Notes

Citations

External links 

 

 
Snake families
Taxa named by Leopold Fitzinger
Snakes